Grant Hardy is professor of history and religious studies and former director of the humanities program at the University of North Carolina at Asheville. He earned his B.A. in ancient Greek in 1984 from Brigham Young University and his Ph.D. in Chinese language and literature from Yale University in 1988. Having written, cowritten, or edited several books in the fields of history, humanities, and religious texts as literature, Hardy is known for literary studies of the Book of Mormon.

Chinese Language and Literature Studies 
Hardy has a PhD in Chinese Language and Literature from Yale University. At 19 years of age, he served a 2 year Mandarin-speaking religious mission for the Church of Jesus Christ of Latter-day Saints (LDS Church) in Taichung (Taizhong), Taiwan.

Mormon studies

Book of Mormon study editions and notes 
Hardy's contributions in Mormon studies are The Book of Mormon: A Reader's Edition (2003), Understanding the Book of Mormon: A Readers' Guide (2010) and The Book of Mormon: Another Testament of Jesus Christ: Maxwell Institute Study Edition, (2018).

Reception 
Individual works
According to a review by Michael Austin of The Book of Mormon: Another Testament of Jesus Christ, Maxwell Institute Study Edition (2018; Hardy, ed.), "By combining with a serious and thoughtful scholar like Grant Hardy, the [LDS] Church has produced and authorized a version of its signature scripture that is orders of magnitude more helpful, and more scholarly, than anything it has produced before."

Hardy's Understanding the Book of Mormon (2010) has been received favorably for what its publisher, Oxford University Press, describes as "comprehensive analysis of the work's narrative structure."

In general
Grant Shreve says the Book of Mormon's text, "once derided as 'a fiction of hob-goblins and bugbears,'" now is being examined by non-Mormon academics and university students, its inclusion on syllabi facilitated by "attractive reader’s editions of the Book of Mormon armed with immaculate scholarly introductions framing it for non-Mormon audiences" by Hardy (2005) and also by Laurie Maffly-Kipp (2008, Penguin).

Neal Rappleye, in the Mormon apologetics journal Interpreter, lauds Hardy's demonstrations of the Book of Mormon's "depth and complexity, multiple voices, and insightful readings," that Rappleye believes bolsters its truth claims.

In April 2016, the Journal of Book of Mormon Studies devoted an issue to Hardy's Book of Mormon studies, its editor saying, "We see his work as crucially transitional, bringing the scripture increasingly to the attention of the broader academy."

Apologetics 
Hardy, a Latter-day Saint, has joined proponents advocating tolerance within the faith for struggles with doubt. Providing context for his work, in his August 5, 2016 address at the annual FairMormon conference, he said, "Academics have little interest in debates about whether Mormonism is true or false, but they are increasingly interested in Mormonism as a religious and social movement." When asked during the   question-and-answer session concerning believers who harbor questions about the Book of Mormon's historicity, he said, "Can faith in the Book of Mormon as inspired fiction be a saving faith? And I think the answer is, absolutely."

A two-part 2017 article by Duane Boyce in the LDS apologetics journal Interpreter questions the didactic effectiveness of Hardy's study's ascriptions of possible psychological motives to individuals categorized as prophets within the Book of Mormon. Boyce believes literary analysis of this type retrograde to the book's divine purpose. Ralph C. Hancock published in Interpreter his argument that Hardy’s reading of the Book of Mormon is "in a way more religious than any other because it is more rational—that is, by allowing natural questions to arise and to resonate, he reveals characters to us (especially the three authors" [Nephi, Mormon, and Moroni] "that are more miraculous because they are more human."

Background: Opening the Book of Mormon studies sub-discipline 

Studies of the Book of Mormon–the foundational scripture of the Latter-day Saints–usually were  apologetic (devotional) or polemical (critical of its truth claims) prior to about 2010. Parallel the burgeoning of Mormon studies generally as a field of more neutral scholarship in early 21st century, university courses began including literary studies of this book.

In 2016, Nicholas J. Frederick said, "With a few notable exceptions, such as Philip Barlow’s Mormons and the Bible and Grant Hardy’s Understanding the Book of Mormon, full-length monographs devoted to [Book of Mormon studies] have been lacking." In 2017, organizers of a Book of Mormon studies symposium said, "Grant Hardy has introduced the content and the depth of the Book of Mormon into the larger academic world...".

Publications

Books
In addition to chapters and journal articles, Hardy has published the following books:

Chapter

Multimedia

See also 
Origin of the Book of Mormon

References

External links 
 

1961 births
Living people
21st-century American historians
21st-century American male writers
Brigham Young University alumni
Yale University alumni
University of North Carolina at Asheville faculty
Mormon apologists
Latter Day Saints from California
Latter Day Saints from North Carolina
Book of Mormon scholars
American male non-fiction writers